Andrea Ottochian (born 28 June 1988) is a Croatian footballer who last played for NK Smoljanci Sloboda Svetvinčenat.

Club career
Ottochian started his career with Rovinj in Croatia’s 3. HNL. Since 2010, Ottochian played for several 1. HNL clubs, including Karlovac, Istra 1961 and Inter Zaprešić. He also spent two seasons with Cibalia in 2. HNL. In January 2018, Ottochian returned to Istra 1961. He had a short spell with Austrian side Liezen in 2019.

References

External links

1988 births
Living people
People from Rovinj
Croatian people of Italian descent
Association football midfielders
Croatian footballers
NK Rovinj players
NK Karlovac players
NK Istra 1961 players
HNK Cibalia players
NK Inter Zaprešić players
NK Vinogradar players
Croatian Football League players
First Football League (Croatia) players
Austrian Landesliga players
Croatian expatriate footballers
Expatriate footballers in Austria
Croatian expatriate sportspeople in Austria